Bosnia and Herzegovina has submitted films for the Academy Award for Best International Feature Film since 1994. The award is handed out annually by the United States Academy of Motion Picture Arts and Sciences to a feature-length motion picture produced outside the United States that contains primarily non-English dialogue. Bosnia and Herzegovina has submitted twenty films for consideration and two, Danis Tanović's No Man's Land and Jasmila Žbanić's Quo Vadis, Aida?, have been nominated for the Academy Award for Best Foreign Language Film. No Man's Land went on to win the award at the 74th Academy Awards. Three other films directed by Tanović and one other directed by Žbanić have been submitted as the Bosnian entry. Many Bosnian actors and directors worked on films submitted by Yugoslavia prior to the breakup of the country in 1991.

Submissions
The Academy of Motion Picture Arts and Sciences has invited the film industries of various countries to submit their best film for the Academy Award for Best Foreign Language Film since 1956. The Foreign Language Film Award Committee oversees the process and reviews all the submitted films. Following this, they vote via secret ballot to determine the five nominees for the award. Below is a list of the films that have been submitted by Bosnia and Herzegovina for review by the Academy for the award by year and the respective Academy Awards ceremony.

Most Bosnian submissions have been films about life in the country after the Bosnian War of the 1990s, made by young directors: all but Begović and Žbanić were 41 or younger when their films were made. Black comedies Fuse and Night Guards, and dramas It's Hard To Be Nice, Grbavica, Days and Hours and Snow were all stories about life after the war. The 1994 nominee, The Awkward Age, was produced during the war, and tells the story of a Communist-era boarding school. The 2005 nominee, Totally Personal, is one of the few documentaries ever submitted for the Foreign Oscar award. All films were primarily in Bosnian. Other than No Man's Land and Quo Vadis, Aida?, none of the submitted Bosnian films have succeeded in getting an Oscar nomination, although Grbavica, winner of the Golden Bear at the 2006 Berlin International Film Festival, was considered an early favorite.

Bosnia typically shortlists three films before announcing their candidate. Skies Above the Landscape was short-listed twice (the release date was changed) but failed to be selected both times.

Fuse, Grbavica, No Man's Land and Quo Vadis, Aida? are readily available in the West with English subtitles.

See also
List of Yugoslav submissions for the Academy Award for Best International Feature Film
List of Academy Award winners and nominees for Best International Feature Film
List of Academy Award–winning foreign-language films

Notes

References

External links
The Official Academy Awards Database
The Motion Picture Credits Database
IMDb Academy Awards Page

Bosnia and Herzegovina
Academy Award For Best Foreign Language Film